Lin-ay sang Negros 2018, the 24th edition of the annual Lin-ay sang Negros was held on April 20, 2018 at the Pana-ad Park and Stadium. A total of 27 candidates from 11 cities and 16 municipalities sent their representatives. Ilog's Danice Decolongon was crowned by Lin-ay sang Negros 2017 winner from Bago Angelika Esther Portugaleza, and Lin-ay sang Negros 2009 winner Vickie Rushton at the end of the event. This pageant edition holds the record for having the most number of contestants.

Final Results

Contestants

Special Awards

Hosts

Patricia Tumulak
Adrian Bobe

Judges

Notes

 This is Ilog's first win.

References

Beauty pageants in the Philippines
Culture of Negros Occidental
2018 beauty pageants
April 2018 events in the Philippines